Orthodox Jewish philosophy comprises the philosophical and theological teachings of Orthodox Judaism. Though Orthodox Judaism sees itself as the heir of traditional rabbinic Judaism, the present-day movement is thought to have first formed in the late 18th century, mainly in reaction to the Jewish emancipation and the growth of the Haskalah and Reform movements. Orthodox Jewish philosophy concerns itself with interpreting traditional Jewish sources, reconciling the Jewish faith with the changes in the modern world and the movement's relationships with the State of Israel and other Jewish denominations.

Philosophies
Specific philosophies developed by Orthodox Jewish thinkers include:
 Torah Judaism, an ideological concept used to legitimize Jewish movements within the framework of Orthodox Jewish values.
 Hasidism, focusing on the importance of prayer, joy and the attachment to Tzadikim and Rebbes
 Musar (ethics), stressing the importance of the study of ethical texts
 Religious Zionism, an ideology that insists on the integration between Zionism and observance of Jewish law
 Torah im Derech Eretz, a school of thought advocating the combination of Jewish and secular education
 Torah Umadda, similar to Torah im Derech Eretz, advocating a combination of Jewish and secular education
 Da'as Torah, the position that the opinion rabbinic authorities are to be sought in various circumstances
 Dirah Betachtonim, a midrashic concept popularized by Chabad thinkers, the making of a "dwelling place for God in the lower realms" is thought to be the purpose of creation

Orthodox Jewish philosophers (from late 18th century)
While the majority of Orthodox rabbinic figures wrote primarily on Talmud and Jewish law (Halacha), some are known for their philosophical and theological writings.

Modern Thought Judaism 
 Samson Raphael Hirsch (1808–1888), German rabbi, authored Horeb (1837), and Nineteen Letters (1836), considered a founder of Modern Orthodoxy and the Torah im Derech Eretz school of thought
 Abraham Isaac Kook (1865–1935), former Chief Rabbi if Israel and an important thinker in Religious Zionism
 Franz Rosenzweig (1886–1929), a theologian and philosopher, noted for his work The Star of Redemption (1921)
 Joseph Soloveitchik (1903–1993), a seminal figure in Modern Orthodox Judaism who helped popularize the Torah Umadda philosophy, authored The Lonely Man of Faith (1965) and Halakhic Man (1983)
 Yeshayahu Leibowitz (1903–1994), a religious philosopher in Israel
 Eliezer Berkovits (1908–1992), authored a number of works on Jewish theology including God, Man, and History (1959) and Man and God: Studies in Biblical Theology (1969)
 Israel Eldad (1910 or 1922–1996), a Zionist teacher and writer associated with the Lehi movement
 David Hartman (1931–2013), philosopher of contemporary Judaism, author of a number of works including A Living Covenant: The Innovative Spirit in Traditional Judaism (1998) and A Heart of Many Rooms: Celebrating the Many Voices Within Judaism (1999)
 Aharon Lichtenstein (b. 1933-2015), a noted Orthodox rabbi and rosh yeshiva who has lectured and published on Jewish philosophy and Talmud
 Daniel Rynhold, Associate Professor of Jewish Philosophy at Yeshiva University and the author of Two Models of Jewish Philosophy: Justifying One's Practices (2005)

Haredi Judaism 
 Elijah of Vilna (1720–1797), the Vilna Gaon, known primarily for his commentary on Talmud and Shulchan Aruch, the Vilna Gaon also authored a number of Kabbalistic works and is noted for his position on Tzimtzum
 Chaim Volozhin (1749–1821), student of the Vilna Gaon, author of Nefesh Ha-Chaim dealing with Kabbalistic and general Jewish theological ideas
 Israel Salanter (1810–1883), founder of the Musar movement, stressed the study of ethical literature as central to Jewish life
 Eliyahu Dessler (1892 or 1830–1953), noted for his work Michtav me-Eliyahu

Hasidic Judaism 
 Yisroel Baal Shem Tov
 Dovber of Mezritch, the Maggid of Mezritch
 The Rebbes of Chabad (most notably, Shneur Zalman of Liadi, Menachem Mendel Schneerson)
 Nachman of Breslov
 Elimelech of Lizhensk
 Menachem Mendel of Kotzk
 Yehudah Aryeh Leib Alter, the Sfas Emes, second Rebbe of Ger
 Joel Teitelbaum, Rebbe of Satmar, anti-Zionist thinker

Sephardic Judaism
 Yosef Hayyim, the Ben Ish Chai
 Elijah Benamozegh
 José Faur

See also
Orthodox Judaism
Jewish philosophy

References

18th-century introductions
Jewish philosophy
Orthodox Judaism